Sengkang MRT/LRT station is a Mass Rapid Transit (MRT) and Light Rail Transit (LRT) interchange station in Sengkang, Singapore. It is an interchange between the North East line (NEL) and Sengkang LRT (SKLRT). Along with Buangkok station, it is one of the two MRT stations located within the Sengkang planning area.

The LRT station opened on 18 January 2003 along with the other East loop stations on the SKLRT, with the NEL station opening later on 20 June. Services on the West loop began service on 29 January 2005. Upgrades to the station are being implemented to improve barrier-free accessibility to the station. Located at Sengkang Town Centre between Sengkang Square and Sengkang East Way, It is directly connected to Compass One, Compass Heights and Sengkang Bus Interchange, and is within walking distance to the Compassvale Bus Interchange.

History

The station was built to serve the Sengkang New Town developed under a government programme to transform the Sengkang area into a fully mature housing estate. Contract 702 for the construction of Sengkang and Buangkok stationswas awarded to Sato Kogyo-Hock Lian Seng Engineering Joint Venture on 26 April 1997. The S$166.4 million (US$ million) contract included the construction of  connecting tunnels between the stations and  tunnels to Sengkang Depot

The elevated LRT station opened on 18 January 2003 when the East loop of the Sengkang LRT (SKLRT) started operations. The underground North East line platforms opened on 20 June that year. The station began to serve the West loop of the SKLRT when certain stations on the loop opened on 29 January 2005.

As part of efforts to improve the overall accessibility of public transport, the overhead pedestrian bridge near Sengkang and other stations have lifts installed from 2013 onwards to improve barrier-free accessibility to major transport nodes. A pair of lifts were installed at the Exit B overhead bridge of the station, one at each side of Sengkang East Way. An additional lift was subsequently installed at the other end of the Exit C overhead bridge of the station in 2021. Sengkang station was also the first batch of ten stations to have additional bicycle parking facilities under the National Cycling Plan announced in 2010.

In 2018, it was announced that the station will be further upgraded, improving barrier-free access to the station, adding new dual-speed escalators leading to the platforms, and new lifts to connect the platforms, concourse and mezzanine levels of the station. As part of the works, the existing staircase from the concourse to the LRT platform is being rebuilt to make way for an additional lift, and an additional staircase was also built to connect the concourse and mezzanine levels of the station. 2 new escalators were added to connect the MRT platform to the concourse, and another new escalator was added to connect the LRT platform to the mezzanine level. The current LRT platform is being expanded in phases to create a more spacious area for commuters by 2022.

Incidents
On 27 February 2020, a power fault along the NEL resulted in service disruptions to the Punggol, Sengkang and Buangkok stations. At 5:36am, a shuttle train service was provided which operated on a single platform between the Punggol and Buangkok stations. In order to facilitate maintenance works, the power source to the tracks between the Hougang and Punggol stations was switched off. Additionally, shuttle bus services to serve the affected stations were provided. The fault was resolved by 11:49am and usual service along the entire NEL resumed at 12:14pm. Investigations later revealed that a broken contact wire affected the power source to trains launching from Sengkang Depot, causing the service disruptions.

Station details

Location and name
The station is in Sengkang New Town along Sengkang Square. The station serves the developments of Compass Heights, Compass One and the Sengkang Bus Interchange, and is within walking distance of the Compassvale Bus Interchange, the Kopitiam Square and the Sengkang Community Hub. The station name, Sengkang, means "prosperous harbour" in Mandarin.

Services

The station serves both the Sengkang LRT line (SKLRT) and the North East line (NEL). The station code is NE16/STC as reflected on official maps. On the SKLRT, the station is the terminus for both East loop and West loop services in both directions. The adjacent stations on the LRT line are Compassvale and Ranggung stations on the East loop and Cheng Lim and Renjong stations on the West loop. Train frequencies range from 3 to 10 minutes depending on the time of the day. The LRT station operates between 5:30am and 12:30am daily.

On the NEL, the station is between the Buangkok and Punggol stations. Train frequencies on the line range from 2.5 to 5 minutes depending on the time of the day. The NEL station operates between 5:45am and 12:30am daily, with the first train bound for HarbourFront departing at around 5:45am and the last train bound for Punggol station departing at 12:28am.

Design
The station has four levels (two platform levels, mezzanine and concourse ground level). It is an integrated hub with the three modes of transport — MRT, LRT and bus — serving the Sengkang area. The MRT/LRT station was the first intermodal station on the MRT network for all three modes of transport. The simple layout, the atrium-like open layout and glass enclosure in the station design allow visual connections through levels and spaces, making navigation in and out of the station easier. Besides integrating with transport facilities, the station is fully integrated with the property developments of Compass Heights and Compass Point (now Compass One).

Public artwork
 
As part of the MRT system's Art-in-Transit Programme, T.R.A.N.S.I.T.I.O.N.S. by Koh Bee Liang, an artwork consisting of two contrasting stained-glass murals, is displayed above ground at the opposite ends of the station mezzanine level. The station is filled with colourful rays as light is filtered through the stained glass windows. The glass murals mark Sengkang's transition from a rural kampung (depicted in "warm nostalgic images of the past") to high-raised buildings (in black and white) that are now part of the landscape. As time goes by, the work also changes throughout the day with the transition of the sun.

The black and white mural of New Sengkang, according to the artist, reflects how "we built up to reach the heavens", without pausing to reflect on the purpose. This is a reference to Singapore's urban renewal, which involves parting of the old and the memories associated with it. The distortions of the new HDB (Housing Development Board) skyscrapers also relate to the fragility of life as a result of the September 11 attacks. In contrast, the Old Sengkang mural, made of opalescent glass, depicts various characters of Singapore's past. The artist, when creating the mural to reflect the past, had conducted various interviews of old residents and used research at the Singapore National Archives for the artwork, in addition to using her experience growing up in a Kampung similar to old Sengkang.

Notes and references

Notes

References

Bibliography

External links

 Official website

Railway stations in Singapore opened in 2003
Railway stations in Sengkang
Mass Rapid Transit (Singapore) stations
Light Rail Transit (Singapore) stations
Sengkang
Sengkang Town Centre
LRT stations in Sengkang